Centropyge nahackyi, also called Nahacky's angelfish, is a small pygmy angelfish found on deeper drop-offs around Johnston Island and Hawaii.

References

nahackyi
Fish of Hawaii